The 14th National Basketball Association All-Star Game was played on January 14, 1964, at Boston Garden in Boston. The coaches were Red Auerbach for the East, and Fred Schaus for the West.

Eastern Conference

Western Conference

Score by periods

 

Halftime— East, 59-49
Third Quarter— East, 86-77
Officials: Sid Borgia and Mendy Rudolph
Attendance: 13,464.

Historical significance
The game was notable for the threat of a strike by the players, who refused to play just before the game unless the owners agreed to recognize the players' union. The owners agreed primarily because it was the first All-Star Game to be televised and if it were not played due to strike it would have been embarrassing at a time when the NBA was still attempting to gain national exposure. The NBA did not have a national TV contract at the time, but ABC agreed to televise the All-Star game and consider a contract for continuing coverage. They made it clear that if the All-Star Game was not played, ABC would drop its interest completely. This led directly to many rights and freedoms not previously extended to professional basketball players.

References

National Basketball Association All-Star Game
All-Star
Basketball competitions in Boston
NBA All-Star Game
1960s in Boston
NBA All-Star Game